Michael Fisher (30 October 1946 – 7 January 2015) was a British solicitor, best known for his work representing those accused of terrorist offences during The Troubles in Northern Ireland.

References

1946 births
2015 deaths
Place of birth missing
Place of death missing